Rudy Muller (born 23 February 1942) is a Luxembourgian former swimmer. He competed in the men's 100 metre backstroke at the 1960 Summer Olympics, where he was eliminated in the heats.

References

1942 births
Living people
Luxembourgian male swimmers
Olympic swimmers of Luxembourg
Swimmers at the 1960 Summer Olympics
Sportspeople from Luxembourg City
Male backstroke swimmers